Bao'an Center station, also spelled Bao'an Centre station, is an underground station on Line 1 and Line 5 of the Shenzhen Metro in Shenzhen, Guangdong Province, China. Line 1 platforms opened on 15 June 2011 and Line 5 platforms opened on 22 June 2011.

Station layout

Exits

References

External links

 Shenzhen Metro Bao'an Center Station (Line 1) (Chinese)
 Shenzhen Metro Bao'an Center Station (Line 1) (English)
 Shenzhen Metro Bao'an Center Station (Line 5) (Chinese)
 Shenzhen Metro Bao'an Center Station (Line 5) (English)

Railway stations in Guangdong
Shenzhen Metro stations
Bao'an District
Railway stations in China opened in 2011